The North American beaver (Castor canadensis) is an invasive species in the southern tip of Patagonia, an area called Tierra del Fuego. Tierra del Fuego is a large island and encompasses land belonging to both Chile and Argentina, and as such, policies and actions to control and eradicate the species has mostly been binational. The beavers were introduced to the area in 1946 due to an effort by the Argentine government to establish a fur trade in the region. Ever since the introduction event, the beavers have spread throughout most of Tierra del Fuego and have even been recently spotted on the Brunswick Peninsula, mainland Chile.

Impacts 

The impact of the beavers on Tierra del Fuego's forest landscape has been described as "the largest landscape-level alteration in subantarctic forests since the last ice age." But before talking about how they are physically changing the ecosystems they invade, it is important to recognize the factors that contribute to their success as invaders. The first is that they lack a true predator in Tierra del Fuego. This, combined with local populations unwilling or unable to hunt beavers for several decades, led to the beaver population growing almost exponentially. The second most important aspect leading to their proliferation is the fact that the land of Tierra del Fuego provides exceptional habit space for beavers. Much of the area is covered in land in close proximity to rivers and streams, and the island is heavily forested with trees and plants that provide great sources of food and shelter, vital resources that also lie directly next to those rivers and streams.   

However, because of these facts of the system, along with the population explosion, beaver impact and damage to hundreds of acres of Tierra del Fuego has been extensive. They are responsible for full scale structural changes in habitat, including the destruction of riparian trees, hydrological changes to rivers via the creation of dams, inducing sediment deposition and increasing retention and accumulation of nutrients and organic matter in rivers and streams. Something important to recognize when thinking about these impacts is that, in North American habitats, the species' native habitat, coevolution over millions of years has led to their ability to defend and buffer against beaver impacts, especially thinking about the trees of the region. South American systems are completely susceptible and therefore have little to  no ability to recover after the introduction of beavers in the area.           

Apart from causing structural changes to the landscape, an act which causes a cascade of effects along the entire ecosystem by destroying habitat and also facilitating invasions of other exotic plants and animals, the impacts of beavers are felt by local populations of humans, as well. Originally, the beavers were localized in a highly remote part of Tierra del Fuego. However, as discussed, their range expanded rapidly over time, putting them in direct contact with the sparsely populated local towns of the area. As a result, beavers have caused damage by flooding roads and farmland, chewing down internet and cell service poles, and destroying fences meant to keep in farm animals. It is estimated that these problems cause Argentina alone $66 million a year.

Policies 

One of the more obvious solutions one may think of when figuring out ways to control the beaver population is by local and national governments encouraging recreational hunting of the animal. As discussed in the previous section though, both Argentina and Chile had laws preventing this practice for several decades before, in the 1990s, they finally repealed and promoted civilian action in population control. However, this plan failed for several reasons. The first is that the population had grown to such an extent by then that the effort by local hunters needed to be massive and persistent in order to drive them to a number that mitigated their impact. This never materialized. This may be because the pelts of the animal are not highly sought after in local markets, a possible reason the fur trade did not boom as the Argentine government had hoped in the 1940s. The lack of incentive to hunt negatively affected motivation to hunt. This meant that hunters would have to kill purely for sport, an option that was not popular among many. An underlying factor to this, even extending to the wider human populations of both countries as a whole, is that beavers are not viewed as a destructive invasive species. This may be attributed to a lack of scientific knowledge on the subject of invasive species, but not to be undermined is the cultural view that beavers are peaceful, dam-building herbivores that many view with a sense of adoration.        

In 2008, Chile and Argentina passed binational legislation, Resolution 157/10, that ended the policy of population control and called for complete eradication of the species from Tierra del Fuego. This was passed in accordance with research conducted by scientists from nations like the United States and New Zealand that found that this method was possible but expensive, costing an estimated $33 million. In many ways, this agreement is an important success story in the ways in which multiple countries can come together to solve an environmental issue. Tierra del Fuego is an instance of a natural environment that has been largely untouched by human activity. It is a prized natural park for both Chileans and Argentinians. In this way, governmental environment groups of both countries have involved themselves as stakeholders, actively contributing to the science, research, and funding of solutions to the problem. As discussed, local towns are stakeholders in the issue as the beavers are a nuisance species for them, causing millions of dollars in property damage. Most notably, global environmental groups have involved themselves as stakeholders, as well. As mentioned, scientists from the U.S. and New Zealand were involved in the drafting of the legislation that was ultimately passed by the home countries. Groups like the Global Environment Facility have aided by granting millions of dollars in the eradication effort. This is truly a world-wide interest due to the fact that Southern Patagonia contains such pristine natural forests, and the fact that they are being destroyed via human-introduced means gives cause for a global reaction at the extent that it currently is, with the hopes that it will only continue to grow.

See also 
 Beaver eradication in Tierra del Fuego

References 

Beavers
Mammals of North America